Shirland Township is located in Winnebago County, Illinois. It includes the unincorporated community of Shirland.

As of the 2010 census, its population was 988 and it contained 423 housing units.

Geography

Demographics

References

External links
City-data.com
Winnebago County Official Site

1849 establishments in Illinois
Populated places established in 1849
Rockford metropolitan area, Illinois
Townships in Illinois
Townships in Winnebago County, Illinois